Lewis William Beck Jr. (April 19, 1922 – April 3, 1970) was an All-American college basketball player who was captain of the United States Olympic basketball team that won the Gold medal at the 1948 Summer Olympics.  Before he began playing for Oregon State University, he suffered a leg injury in World War II.

Lew died of cancer in April 1970, his funeral was on April 7, 1970 in Portland, Oregon. The Oregon State University basketball team honored him by including among its annual awards the Lew Beck Memorial Award, the award given to the player who is deemed to be the team's most outstanding newcomer. In 1981, Lew was inducted into the Oregon Sports Hall of Fame.

References

1922 births
1970 deaths
All-American college men's basketball players
American men's basketball players
Basketball players at the 1948 Summer Olympics
Basketball players from Portland, Oregon
Guards (basketball)
Medalists at the 1948 Summer Olympics
Olympic gold medalists for the United States in basketball
Oregon State Beavers men's basketball players
Phillips 66ers players
United States men's national basketball team players
Deaths from cancer in Montana
United States Army personnel of World War II